Luis Ernesto Pérez Martínez (born 15 March 1989) is a Mexican professional footballer who plays as a midfielder.

Honours
Lobos BUAP
Ascenso MX: Clausura 2017
Campeón de Ascenso: 2016-17

Necaxa
Copa MX: Clausura 2018
Supercopa MX: 2018

Morelia
Liga de Expansión MX: Clausura 2022

References

External links

Back to Club Nexaca

Living people
1989 births
Mexican footballers
Association football midfielders
Atlético Morelia players
Club Necaxa footballers
Cimarrones de Sonora players
Lobos BUAP footballers
Liga MX players
Ascenso MX players
Tercera División de México players
Footballers from Sonora
People from Moctezuma, Sonora